Carenum perplexum is a species of ground beetle in the subfamily Scaritinae. It was described by White in 1841.

References

perplexum
Beetles described in 1841